Alkalibacillus is a genus in the phylum Bacillota (Bacteria).

Etymology
The name Alkalibacillus derives from:New Latin noun alkali (from Arabic article al, the; Arabic noun qaliy, ashes of saltwort), alkali; Latin masculine gender noun bacillus, rod; New Latin masculine gender noun Alkalibacillus, bacillus living under alkaline conditions.

Species
The genus contains 8 species (including basonyms and synonyms), namely
 A. aidingensis  ( Li et al. 2021)
 A. almallahensis ( Perez-Dav et al. 2014 )
 A. filiformis ( Romano et al. 2005, ; Latin noun filum, a thread; Latin suff. -formis (from Latin noun forma, figure, shape, appearance), -like, in the shape of; New Latin masculine gender adjective filiformis, thread-shaped.)
 A. flavidus ( Yoon et al. 2010, ; Latin masculine gender adjective flavidus, pale yellow.)
 A. haloalkaliphilus ( (Fritze 1996) Jeon et al. 2005,  (Type species of the genus).; Greek noun hals, halos (ἅλς, ἁλός), salt; New Latin noun alkali (from Arabic article al, the; Arabic noun qaliy, ashes of saltwort), alkali; Greek adjective φίλος loving; New Latin masculine gender adjective haloalkaliphilus, loving briny)
 A. halophilus ( Tian et al. 2009, ; Greek noun hals, halos (ἅλς, ἁλός), salt; New Latin masculine gender adjective philus (from Greek masculine gender adjective φίλος), friend, loving; New Latin masculine gender adjective halophilus, salt-loving.)
 A. salilacus ( Jeon et al. 2005, ; Latin noun sal salis, salt; Latin noun lacus -us, lake; New Latin genitive case noun salilacus, of a salt lake.)
 A. silvisoli ( Usami et al. 2007, ;: Latin noun silva, forest; Latin noun solum, soil; New Latin genitive case noun silvisoli, of forest soil, the source of isolation of the type strain.)

References 

Bacteria genera
Bacillaceae